Huang Qiang (born 11 April 1982) is a Chinese-born Malaysian diver. He originally competed for the Chinese team and won a silver medal at the 1998 Asian Games as a sixteen-year-old. At the 2000 FINA Diving World Cup, Huang Qiang and his partner Tian Liang won the gold medal at the 10m synchronised event and the pair was viewed as a strong contender for gold at the 2000 Summer Olympics but Huang Qiang withdrew from the competition due to a back injury. His replacement Hu Jia and Tian Liang won silver. After his injury, Huang began a new career as a coach and eventually worked for the Malaysian national team. In 2011 he returned to the competition and received Malaysian citizenship which allowed him to qualify for the 2012 Summer Olympics under the Malaysian flag. In London, he competed in the synchronised 3 metre springboard (with partner Bryan Nickson Lomas) and 3 m springboard events. In 2017, Huang was charged with raping a Malaysian diver but he was subsequently acquitted and discharged.

References 

1982 births
Living people
Divers at the 2012 Summer Olympics
Olympic divers of Malaysia
Malaysian male divers
Chinese male divers
Asian Games medalists in diving
Divers at the 1998 Asian Games
Asian Games silver medalists for China
Medalists at the 1998 Asian Games
Nanjing Sport Institute alumni
Chinese emigrants to Malaysia